The Order of the Sacred Tripod (寶鼎勳章), also referred to as the Order of the Precious Tripod or Pao Ting, is a military award of the Republic of China. It was created on 15 May 1929 by Chiang Kai-shek for significant contributions to national security. The order is organized into nine grades. The central design of the order's insignia is an image of a tripod surrounded by golden rays. The symbolism of this is that as the tripod is considered a national treasure, so too is the recipient of the order.

Grades
The order is divided into nine grades, they are as follows:

Notable recipients

References

External links 

Orders, decorations, and medals of the Republic of China
Awards established in 1929
1929 establishments in China
Military awards and decorations of China